Shinsei may refer to:
 Shinsei, Gifu, a former town in Japan
 Shinsei (restaurant), a restaurant in Dallas, Texas
 Shinsei Bank, a Japanese commercial bank